Emmanuel Ebuka Osadebe (born 1 October 1996) is an Irish professional footballer who plays as a midfielder for Bradford City.

Club career
Osadebe started playing football with his local side Dundalk. He joined Gillingham from Tottenham Hotspur Foundation College Programme in May 2015.  He made his Gillingham debut on 8 August 2015 in 4–0 home win over Sheffield United where he was named Man of the Match. However, it later emerged that Osadebe had been ineligible to play, with Gillingham having mistakenly registered his previous club with the Football League and the FA as Tottenham rather than Dundalk. As a result, Gillingham received a £4,000 suspended fine, but escaped a points deduction.

In November 2015 Osadebe was invited to train with the Republic of Ireland U21 squad ahead of their friendly against Norway, but did not feature in the matchday squad. As his parents hail from Nigeria, Osadebe is also eligible to represent Nigeria.

Osadebe received the 2015–16 Gillingham Goal of the Season award for his solo effort against Bury in November 2015.  He signed a new one-year deal with Gillingham, with the option of a further one-year extension, at the conclusion of the 2015–16 season, however he was released by the club a year later.

On 31 May 2017, Osadebe joined League Two side Cambridge United on a two-year deal. On 18 January 2018, Osadebe joined Newport County on loan until the end of the 2017–18 season. He made his debut for Newport five days later against Morecambe as a half-time substitute. His loan arrangement at Newport was terminated on 23 March 2018 and he returned to Cambridge United.

He was released by Cambridge United at the end of the 2018–19 season. In the summer of 2019 he was signed by Macclesfield Town on a one year deal. On 1 February 2020 it was announced that he was one of three players to have left financially troubled Macclesfield during the January 2020 transfer window, following a meeting with the English Football League.

On 3 September 2020, he joined Walsall on a free transfer.

On 10 June 2022, Osadebe joined fellow League Two side Bradford City for an undisclosed fee, signing a two-year contract.  Osadebe’s first league game for Bradford came to an end after just seven minutes when he broke his leg in two places against Doncaster Rovers.

Career statistics

References

External links

1996 births
Living people
Irish people of Nigerian descent
Irish sportspeople of African descent
Republic of Ireland association footballers
People from Dundalk
Gillingham F.C. players
Cambridge United F.C. players
Newport County A.F.C. players
Macclesfield Town F.C. players
Walsall F.C. players
English Football League players
Association football midfielders
Bradford City A.F.C. players